Auckland City was a territorial authority with city status covering the central isthmus of the urban area of Auckland, New Zealand. It was governed by the Auckland City Council from 1989 to 2010, and as a territory within the wider Auckland Region, was also governed by Auckland Regional Council. Auckland City was disestablished as a local authority on 1 November 2010, when Auckland City Council was amalgamated with other councils of the Auckland Region into the new Auckland Council. At the time of its disestablishment, the city had a resident population of around 450,000.

The Auckland City included the Auckland CBD – a major financial and commercial centre – the surrounding suburbs, and Hauraki Gulf islands such as Waiheke and Great Barrier Island.

Geography
The mainland part of Auckland City occupied the Auckland isthmus, also known as the Tāmaki isthmus. The Waitematā Harbour, which opens to the Hauraki Gulf, separated North Shore City from the isthmus. The Manukau Harbour, which opens to the Tasman Sea, separated Manukau City from the isthmus. The distance between the two harbours is particularly narrow at each end of the isthmus. At the western end, the Whau River, an estuarial arm of the Waitematā Harbour, comes within two kilometres of the waters of the Manukau Harbour on the west coast and marks the beginning of the Northland Peninsula. A few kilometres to the southeast at Ōtāhuhu, the Tāmaki River, an arm of the Hauraki Gulf on the east coast, comes just 1200 metres from the Manukau's waters. Being part of the Auckland volcanic field, much of the isthmus is mantled with volcanic rocks and soils, and several prominent scoria cones dot the isthmus.

Many Hauraki Gulf islands were part of Auckland City. Such islands of the inner gulf included Rangitoto, Motutapu, Browns Island, Motuihe, Rakino, Ponui and Waiheke, while the outer gulf islands included Little Barrier Island, Great Barrier and the Mokohinau Islands.

Local government 
In November 1989, central government restructured local authorities throughout New Zealand. After substantial protests and legal challenges, Auckland City was merged with eight smaller local authorities to form a new Auckland City Council. The new Auckland City had double the population of the old. However, amalgamation, forced onto local authorities often against their will, was criticised to have led to less democracy and higher rates for the same services.

A further restructuring and amalgamation brought all seven councils in the area and the Auckland Regional Council into one "SuperCity" (Auckland Council), starting 1 November 2010.

Coat of arms

Demography 

Auckland City was the most populous local authority in the country, with a population of 450,300 at 30 June 2010. In 2010 it was made up of 188 ethnic groups, making it New Zealand's most diverse city, and slightly more diverse than in 2007, when 185 ethnic groups had been counted. In 2010, the life expectancy was 83 years for women, and 79.6 years for men, while the average age of the population was 33.4 years, with 35.9 years for the whole country.

In 2009, Auckland was rated the fourth-best place to live in the world, in human resources consultancy Mercer's annual survey.

Economy 

In the year to March 2009, Auckland City had 353,000 jobs, of which 26.3% was held by property and business services, as well as 65,655 businesses, making up 13.1% of New Zealand's businesses and 16.2% of New Zealand's jobs. Over 2009 to the month of March, Auckland City's unemployment rate increased to 5.6%, compared to the overall New Zealand unemployment rate of 4.5%. In addition the city's economic output declined by 2.4%. Gareth Stiven, the economic manager of Auckland City, stated that this was because the city's economy was heavily involved with service industries, such as banking and insurance, which were affected by financial crises. However, over the last five years of its existence, Auckland's economic growth averaged 1.4% each year, higher than the average of the region and the nation.

In 2003 three of the ten largest companies in New Zealand (Air New Zealand, Fletcher Building, and Foodstuffs) were headquartered in Auckland City. Many large corporations were housed within Auckland CBD, the central part of Auckland City.

Air New Zealand has its worldwide headquarters, called "The Hub", off Beaumont and Fanshawe Streets in the Western Reclamation; the airline moved there from the Auckland CBD in 2006. In September 2003 Air New Zealand was the only one of the very largest corporations in New Zealand to have its headquarters within the Auckland CBD.

Suburbs 
These lists of suburbs are arranged electorally, by the wards, starting from the west.

 Avondale-Roskill:
 Avondale
 Blockhouse Bay
 Lynfield
 New Windsor
 Hillsborough
 Three Kings
 Waikowhai
 Mount Roskill
 Sandringham
 Wesley

 Eden-Albert:
 Balmoral
 Morningside
 Mount Albert
 Mount Eden
 Owairaka
 Kingsland
 Sandringham
 Waterview

 Western Bays:
 Grey Lynn
 Newton
 Western Springs
 Point Chevalier
 Westmere
 Ponsonby
 Herne Bay
 Freemans Bay
 Saint Marys Bay

 Hobson:
 Auckland CBDCBD
 Epsom
 Greenlane
 Newmarket
 One Tree Hill
 Parnell
 Remuera
 Mechanics Bay
 Grafton
 Newton

 Eastern Bays:
 Mission Bay
 Kohimarama
 Saint Heliers
 Ōrākei
 Glendowie
 Meadowbank
 Saint Johns

 Tamaki–Maungakiekie:
 Glen Innes
 Point England
 Tāmaki
 Panmure
 Mount Wellington
 Ellerslie
 Ōtāhuhu
 Westfield
 Southdown
 Penrose
 Oranga
 Te Papapa
 Onehunga
 Royal Oak
 Stonefields

Note: CBD - central business district

For the suburbs of the other cities within the Auckland urban area, see North Shore, Manukau, Waitakere and Papakura.

Roads 
 Dominion Road – an arterial road running north–south across most of the central isthmus
 Great North Road – begins as a continuation of Karangahape Road and runs south-westward before crossing into what was Waitakere City
 Great South Road – runs south from Epsom and crosses from Ōtāhuhu into what was Manukau City
 Karangahape Road – a commercial street running west–east and intersecting Queen Street at the southern edge of the CBD
 Portage Road – in Ōtāhuhu, the southernmost suburb, following the path of Te Tō Waka, the Māori canoe portage between the Tāmaki River and the Manukau Harbour, intersecting Great South Road
 Queen Street – the main commercial street, running south, uphill from Queens Wharf through the CBD
 Tāmaki Drive – a coastal road running eastward from the eastern edge of the CBD to Saint Heliers

Sister cities and friendship cities
Auckland City had six sister cities and two friendship city relationships. All of these cities except Hamburg (Germany) and Galway (Ireland) are located around the Pacific Rim.

See also 
 Auckland waterfront
 Auckland isthmus

References 

 A Complete Guide To Heraldry by A.C. Fox-Davies 1909.

External links 

 Auckland City Council website, the local authority for Auckland
 History of Auckland City by Graham Bush
 Heart of the City website by the Auckland CBD business' association
 Heritage Walks: The Engineering Heritage of Auckland, historic text, 360° panoramas and heritage imagery accessed through an interactive map

Territorial authorities of New Zealand
Populated places established in 1871
Populated places disestablished in 2010
History of Auckland
Former subdivisions of the Auckland Region